Breast cancer metastasis suppressor 1 is a protein that in humans is encoded by the BRMS1 gene.

This gene reduces the metastatic potential, but not the tumorogenicity, of human breast cancer and melanoma cell lines. The protein encoded by this gene localizes primarily to the nucleus, and is a component of the mSin3a family of histone deacetylase complexes (HDAC). The protein contains two coiled-coil motifs and several imperfect leucine zipper motifs. Alternative splicing results in two transcript variants encoding different isoforms.

References

External links

Further reading